Dongolawi is a Nubian language of northern Sudan.
Dongolawi is an Arabic term based on the town of Old Dongola, the centre of the historic Christian kingdom of Makuria (6th to 14th century). Today's Dongola was founded during the 19th century on the western side of the Nile. The Dongolawi call their language Andaandi  "(the language) of our home".

Nearly all Dongolawi speakers are also speakers of Sudanese Arabic, the lingua franca of Sudan. Arabic–Dongolawi bilingualism is replacive in the sense that Dongolawi is threatened by complete replacement by Arabic (Jakobi 2008).

Dongolawi is closely related to Kenzi (Mattokki), spoken in southern Egypt. They were once considered dialects of a single language, Kenzi-Dongolawi. More recent research recognises them as distinct languages without a "particularly close genetic relationship." Apart from these two languages spoken along the Nile, three extinct varieties were included under Kenzi-Dongolawi.

References

External links
 Dongolawi basic lexicon at the Global Lexicostatistical Database
 The Miracle of Saint Mina – Gis Miinan Nokkor 

Nubian languages
Languages of Egypt
Nubians in Sudan